Baie-des-Chaloupes is an unorganized territory of Quebec located in the regional county municipality of Antoine-Labelle, in Laurentides, in Québec, in Canada. It covers a land area of 900 km.

History 

This unorganized territory was created on January 1, 1981 by the Government of Québec.

Demographics
Population trend:
 Population in 2011: 0
 Population in 2006: 0
 Population in 2001: 0
 Population in 1996: 0
 Population in 1991: 4

See also
List of unorganized territories in Quebec

References

Unorganized territories in Laurentides